Gang War (released as All Square in the UK) is a 1928 American part-talking gangster film, best known for being the main feature attached to Steamboat Willie, the debut of Mickey Mouse in sound. The film starred Jack Pickford in his last major role as "Clyde", a saxophone player whose love for a dancer named Flowers (Olive Borden) traps him in the middle of a gang war. The film was released with talking sequences, as well as a musical score and sound effects for the silent sections. But despite the synchronised sound as well as the all-star cast, the film is largely unknown in its own right and is now a lost film, being overshadowed by its far more famous preceding short.

Plot
The film follows the saxophone player Clyde, who busks on the San Francisco Bay waterfront. One night, he meets Flowers, and teaches her to dance, but finds that "Blackjack" (Eddie Gribbon), the leader of a ruthless gang, is also in love with her. Despite the intense turf war between "Blackjack" and a rival gangster named Mike Luego (Walter Long), "Blackjack" wins the heart of Flowers and marries her, but without consummating the marriage. Clyde is eventually able to win "Blackjack" over however, and "Blackjack" sacrifices himself to protect Clyde and Flowers from Luego.

Cast
Jack Pickford as Clyde Baxter
Olive Borden as Flowers
Lorin Raker as Reporter in the Prologue
Jack McKee as Reporter in the Prologue
Mabel Albertson as Reporter in the Prologue
Eddie Gribbon as Blackjack
Walter Long as Mike Luego
Frank Chew as Wong

Production
Gang War was produced in black and white on Academy ratio 35 mm film, and was originally to be a silent film. However, a spoken prologue was added, in which a group of reporters (including one played by Mabel Albertson) discuss the events that are to come.

Reception
Reception to the film was rather muted; while The New York Times called it "better than the majority of its ilk", the paper still dismissed it as "More Gang Fights". In particular, the paper found the film to be rather cliché — it balked at the sentimentality of "Blackjack"'s death scene and claimed the writers "would confer a favor upon a patient public if they mutinied against the use of some words, especially that simple monosyllable, 'well' ". The Allmovie rated the film just 1.5 stars out of 5, calling the prologue "irrelevant", but praising Long's performance as being "brutish" but "right in his element".

References

External links

1928 films
1928 crime films
American gangster films
Lost American films
Films directed by Bert Glennon
American crime films
Film Booking Offices of America films
1928 lost films
Films with screenplays by Edgar Allan Woolf
1920s American films